General elections were held in Burma between 27 January and 10 February 1974. They were the first elections held under the new constitution, which had been approved in a referendum the previous year. This had made the country a one-party state with the Burma Socialist Programme Party (BSPP) as the sole legal party. The BSPP won all 451 seats in the People's Assembly. Voter turnout was reported to be 94.6%.

Results

References

1974 in Burma
Elections in Myanmar
Burma
One-party elections
Election and referendum articles with incomplete results